Oleksandr Muzychuk (born January 10, 1994) is a Ukrainian footballer playing with Polissya Zhytomyr in the Ukrainian Second League.

Playing career 
Muzychuk began his career abroad in 2011 with FC Nistru Otaci in the Moldovan National Division. In 2013, he returned home to play with FC Zbruch Volochysk  in the Ukrainian Football Amateur League. After a season in Ukraine he returned to the Moldovan National Division to play with FC Costuleni. After the club ceased operations he played in the Ukrainian Second League with FC Podillya Khmelnytskyi. In 2016, he was loaned abroad to the Canadian Soccer League for FC Ukraine United.

In 2017, he featured in the Ukrainian First League for a loan deal with FC Kolos Kovalivka.In 2020, he signed a contract with FC Polissya Zhytomyr.

References 

1994 births
Living people
People from Truskavets
Ukrainian footballers
FC Nistru Otaci players
FC Ahrobiznes Volochysk players
FC Costuleni players
FC Podillya Khmelnytskyi players
FC Ukraine United players
FC Kolos Kovalivka players
FC Polissya Zhytomyr players
Moldovan Super Liga players
Canadian Soccer League (1998–present) players
Ukrainian First League players
Association football midfielders
Ukrainian Second League players
Ukrainian expatriate footballers
Expatriate footballers in Moldova
Ukrainian expatriate sportspeople in Moldova
Expatriate soccer players in Canada
Ukrainian expatriate sportspeople in Canada
Expatriate footballers in Germany
Ukrainian expatriate sportspeople in Germany
Sportspeople from Lviv Oblast